"A Voice in the Dark" is a single by Blind Guardian from their ninth studio album, At the Edge of Time. It was released on 25 June 2010 in Germany and 6 July 2010 in North America.

Track listing 

 "A Voice in the Dark" – 5:45
 "You're the Voice" – 4:43 (John Farnham Cover)
 "War of the Thrones" (acoustic version) – 5:20

Charts

Personnel

 Hansi Kürsch - vocals
 André Olbrich - guitar
 Marcus Siepen - guitar
 Frederik Ehmke - drums

References

External links 
 Official page
 Release date information

2010 singles
Blind Guardian songs
2010 songs
Nuclear Blast Records singles
Songs written by Hansi Kürsch
Songs written by André Olbrich